Colon High School is a public high school in northeastern St Joseph County.  It serves the residents of Colon, Michigan and the surrounding community including Colon, Leonidas and rural areas.  Its high school mascot is the Magi a Rabbit (sometimes depicted as a rabbit in a hat).
About its mascot
Colon High Schools mascot is the Magi another word for magic.  Colon chose this mascot because Colon, Michigan is the magic capital of the world.  Every year Colon hosts "Magic Week" where many performers put on displays, skits and magic tricks for the town and surrounding areas.
Colon High School won the MHSAA Division 1 2019 state championship in 8-man football.

External links
Colon High School website

References

Public high schools in Michigan
Schools in St. Joseph County, Michigan